The Attigny–Baâlons railway was an  long narrow gauge and metre gauge railway in the north of France, which was put into service in sections 1904 and operated until 1948.

History 
The secondary railway line of the Chemins de fer départementaux des Ardennes was built with the unusual 800 mm gauge for military considerations, so that it could not be used by enemy rail vehicles in the event of an invasion. It was opened in 1904, only converted to metre gauge after the First World War around 1923, and operated until 1933.

References 

Railway lines in Grand Est
800 mm gauge railways
Metre gauge railways in France
Chemins de fer départementaux des Ardennes